is a Japanese voice actress from Tokyo. She is currently with First Wind Production.

Filmography

TV anime
Castle Town Dandelion (2015), elementary schoolboy
The Testament of Sister New Devil (2015), woman
Orange (2016), Takako Chino
Hundred (2016), Liddy Steinberg
Hybrid x Heart Magias Academy Ataraxia (2016), Reiri Hida
Three Leaves, Three Colors (2016), female customer
Death March to the Parallel World Rhapsody (2018), Iona
Harukana Receive (2018), Referee
Grand Blue (2018), Student B
Zombie Land Saga (2018), Yūgiri
BanG Dream! 2nd Season (2019), Black Suits
Seton Academy: Join the Pack! (2020), Ruka Bando
Zombie Land Saga Revenge (2021), Yūgiri

Film
Orange: Future (2016), Takako Chino

Video games

 Raiden V  (2016), Valbarossa Hawkeye

References

External links
 Official agency profile 
 

Living people
Japanese video game actresses
Japanese voice actresses
Voice actresses from Tokyo
1993 births